Cluj Arena is a multi-purpose stadium in Cluj-Napoca, Romania. It serves as the home of Universitatea Cluj of the Liga I and was completed on 1 October 2011. It is also the home of the Untold Festival. The facility, owned by the county council of Cluj, can also be used for a variety of other activities such as track and field events and rugby union games. It replaced the Stadionul Ion Moina, which served as Universitatea Cluj's home from 1919 until the end of the 2007-08 season.   

The stadium seats 30,201, making it the sixth largest stadium in Romania by seating capacity. It has four two-tiered stands, all of them covered. The seats of the stadium are grey.

The building is located west of Central Park, and next to the Someșul Mic river and the BT Arena.

History

The first stadium for football and track and field was built from 1908 to 1911. The Stadionul Ion Moina was opened in 1911, consisting of a single wooden stand with a capacity of just 1,500. The first game at the new stadium was a friendly against Turkish team Galatasaray, which Cluj won 8–1. 

New wooden stands were built in 1961, increasing the capacity to 28,000. Demolition of the Stadionul Ion Moina officially began on 20 November 2008. Construction of the new Cluj Arena began on July 16, 2009 The stadium opened its gate for the public on 1 October 2011. Eight days later, Scorpions performed at the stadium. The show was sold out with a crowd of 45,000. The next day, Smokie played at Cluj Arena. The first match at the stadium was a game played between Universitatea Cluj and Kuban Krasnodar. The first official match was Universitatea Cluj vs. FC Brașov on 17 October 2011, which finished 1–0.

Matches

Romania national football team

Other events

Concerts

Gallery

See also
List of football stadiums in Romania 
List of European stadia by capacity

References

External links

clujarena.ro, the venue's official website 

 

2011 establishments in Romania
Buildings and structures in Cluj-Napoca 
Romania national football team
Football venues in Romania
Athletics (track and field) venues in Romania
Rugby union stadiums in Romania
Music venues in Romania 
Music venues completed in 2011
FC Universitatea Cluj
Sports venues in Cluj-Napoca